The 2017 1. deild kvinnur was the 33rd season of women's league football in the Faroe Islands.

The league was won by EB/Streymur/Skála, winning its first title and ending KÍ's streak of 17 consecutive titles. By winning, EBS/Skála qualified to 2018–19 UEFA Women's Champions League, becoming only the second club from the Faroe Islands to play the competition.

Format
Originally seven teams entered the league, but AB/B71 withdrew after 2 matches. This maintained the league with the same format of the previous seasons, with the six teams playing each other four times for a total of 20 matches.

League table

Top scorers

References

1. deild kvinnur seasons
Faroe Islands
women
women